Harold A. Robe (1881-1946) was an early 20th century American lyricist. He is known for penning several popular songs, most notably Dear Old Pal of Mine. For many of his songs, Robe collaborated with composer Gitz Rice. Other notable songs include, Because You're Here, Mary Lee (Merrily I'll Come to You), and Never Swap Horses When You're Crossing a Stream.

References

Bibliography
Tyler, Don. Hit songs, 1900-1955: American popular music of the pre-rock era. Jefferson, N.C.: McFarland, 2007. . 
Vogel, Frederick G. World War I Songs: A History and Dictionary of Popular American Patriotic Tunes, with Over 300 Complete Lyrics. Jefferson: McFarland & Company, Inc., 1995. . 

1881 births
1946 deaths
American lyricists